The 2018 East Asia Cup was a Twenty20 (T20) cricket tournament, which was held in Hong Kong in September 2018. Matches were played at the Mission Road Ground in Mong Kok and the Hong Kong Cricket Club in Wong Nai, where a round-robin series was followed by a final. Kowloon Cricket Club was originally scheduled to host the final and a third-place play-off on 16 September, but the final was moved to the previous and played at the Mission Road Ground (and the third-place match cancelled) due to the expected arrival of Typhoon Mangkhut.

The Twenty20 East Asia Cup is an annual competition featuring China, Hong Kong, Japan and South Korea that was first played in 2015 and alternates annually between a men's and women's event. The women's event was won by China in 2015 and by Hong Kong in 2017. South Korea won the inaugural men's edition in 2016. Hong Kong were represented by the Hong Kong Dragons side, a team representing Hong Kong's Chinese community in both the 2016 and 2018 men's events. Matches did not have Twenty20 International status.

Japan defeated the Hong Kong Dragons in the final on 15 September 2018 to win the East Asia Cup for the first time.

Squads

Round-robin

Points table

Matches

Final

References

External links
 Series home at ESPN Cricinfo

International cricket competitions in 2018–19
2018 Men's Twenty20 East Asia Cup